Painted Daughters is a 1925 Australian silent film directed F. Stuart-Whyte.  Only part of it survives today.

Plot
Mary Elliott and Courtland Nixon are dancing partners in a stage show called Florodora. Mary leaves Courtland and marries a wealthy admirer, who soon goes bankrupt and kills himself, leaving Mary to raise their daughter, Maryon.

Maryon grows up to become a dancer. A theatrical press agent, Ernest, reunites the cast of Floradora and Courtland is reunited with Mary.  There is a fire in which both Mary and Courtland are injured, but they survive and decide to get married. So too do Maryon and Ernest.

Cast

Zara Clinton as Mary Elliott
Nina Devitt as Maryon Fielding
Billie Sim as Rita Railton
Marie Lorraine as Evelyn Shaw
Loretta May as Sheila Kay
Fernande Butler as Nina Walcott
Lucille Lisle as Olive Lennox
Peggy Pryde as wardrobe mistress
Belle Bates as Salvation Nell
Phyllis du Barry as Saharab
Rawdon Blandford as Courtland Nixon
Martin Walker as Warren Fielding
William O'Hanlon as Ernest Glenning
Compton Coutts as Harry Selby
Billy Ryan as Eric Thurston
Herbert Walton as Harry Gratton
Grafton Williams as Edward Thayne
Roland Conway as Charles Dailey
Louis Witts as Peter Flynn
S Hackett as Flash

Production
The movie was the first in a series of films produced by Australasian Films and released through Union Pictures under the banner of "Master Pictures". It was part of an attempt by Australasian Films and Union Theatres, led by Stuart F. Doyle, to make world-class films for the international market. He ended up spending over £100,000 on developing a new studio at Bondi and making a series of features from 1925 to 1928. For this first movie, Australasian decided to import a director from overseas.

F. Stuart-Whyte, a Scotsman who worked in Hollywood for fifteen years, arrived in Sydney in November 1924 to commence pre-production. The movie was shot in a studio at Rushcutter's Bay in Sydney with former Hollywood star Louise Lovely assisting with screen testing. The majority of cast and crew were Australian, but the cast included British music hall star Peggy Pryde, who was then living in Australia.
 
During production, a portion of the movie worth £600 was stolen from the production office.

Reception
The movie was popular at the box office. The success  of this and Sunrise (1926) prompted Australasian to announce they would make twelve new films over the next twelve months. This did not eventuate however the company did make several more films.

References

External links

Painted Daughters at National Film and Sound Archive

1925 films
Australian drama films
Australian silent feature films
Australian black-and-white films
1925 drama films
American drama films
Films from Australasian Films
1920s American films